James Franklin Wiley (May 17, 1832 – January 12, 1902), was a member of the Wisconsin State Senate.

Biography
Wiley was born on May 17, 1832, in Gouverneur, New York. He died on January 12, 1902, and was buried in Hancock, Wisconsin.

Career
Wiley represented the 9th District in the Senate. Other positions he held include Postmaster of Hancock. He was a Republican.

References

External links

People from Gouverneur, New York
People from Hancock, Wisconsin
Republican Party Wisconsin state senators
Wisconsin postmasters
1832 births
1902 deaths
Burials in Wisconsin
19th-century American politicians